Teledesic was a company founded in the 1990s to build a commercial broadband satellite internet constellation. Using low-Earth-orbiting satellites small antennas could be used to provide uplinks of as much as 100 Mbit/s and downlinks of up to 720 Mbit/s. The original 1994 proposal was extremely ambitious, costing over 9 billion USD and originally planning 840 active satellites with in-orbit spares at an altitude of 700 km. In 1997, the plan was scaled back to 288 active satellites at 1400 km. Teledesic Corporation changed its name to Teledesic, LLC by pro forma assignment of its license, granted on 26 January 1998.

The commercial failure of the similar Iridium and Globalstar ventures (composed of 66 and 48 operational satellites respectively) and other systems, along with bankruptcy protection filings, were primary factors in halting the project, and Teledesic officially suspended its satellite construction work on 1 October 2002.

Description
The Teledesic system would have provided "fiber-optic like" links to customers around the world. The system was to act as a network operator and support communications ranging from high-quality voice channels to broadband channels supporting video-conferencing, interactive multimedia, and real-time two-way data flow. Teledesic was notable for gaining early funding from Microsoft Chairman Bill Gates, Craig McCaw, founder of McCaw Cellular Communications, and Saudi prince Alwaleed bin Talal. The system would have used Ka band to send and receive signals from users. Each satellite would have acted as a node in a large-scale packet-switching network. The service was planned to begin in 2002 with a total cost of the project estimated at US$9 billion.

The satellites were three-axis stabilized with a faceted antenna on the bottom and a large articulated solar panel on top. The spacecraft was designed to be compatible with over 20 different launch vehicles to permit launch option flexibility. The satellites were to be launched into a 700 km circular, near-polar (98.2°) Sun-synchronous orbit. The initial rollout was to include 12 orbit planes with 24 spacecraft in each plane. The antenna footprint for each satellite was to be about 700 km2. Teledesic planned 288 satellites in 12 LEO orbits, each at an altitude of 1315 km.

BATSAT (Teledesic T1)
A demonstration satellite for the Teledesic constellation, originally labeled Broadband Advanced Technologies Satellite (BATSAT), and later renamed Teledesic T1 or just T1 (COSPAR ID 1998-012B), was launched from Vandenberg Air Force Base on a Pegasus-XL launch vehicle on 26 February 1998 at 07:07:00 UTC. The satellite differed in size and design from the anticipated satellite for the final constellation, but was designed to support two-way communications at speeds up to E1 rates in the 28.6-to-29.1-GHz band. The 120 kg satellite was placed in a 535 km × 580 km orbit at 97.7° inclination and a period of 95.8 minutes.

It was the first Ka-band satellite in orbit owned by a commercial enterprise. The satellite decayed from orbit on 9 October 2000.

References

External links
 Lloyd's satellite constellations - Teledesic
 Teledesic home page* 
 288 satellite visualization

 What Goes Around: Teledesic 2.0—a column by Robert X. Cringely, October 29, 2009

Communications satellites in low Earth orbit
Internet technology companies of the United States
Defunct spaceflight companies
Satellite Internet access